The 1924 Cincinnati Reds season was a season in American baseball. The team finished fourth in the National League with a record of 83–70, 10 games behind the New York Giants.

Off-season 
Following a second consecutive second-place finish in the National League during the 1923 season, the Reds had a quiet off-season, making only one notable transaction.

On December 11, 1923, the club purchased the contract of pitcher Carl Mays from the New York Yankees.  Mays, the former ace of the Yankees, was coming off a poor season in 1923, earning a 5–2 record with a 6.20 ERA in 81.1 innings pitched, making only seven starts out of his 23 appearances. Mays had previously pitched for the Boston Red Sox from 1915 to 1919, helping them win the World Series twice, in 1915 and 1918. His best season in Boston was in 1917, where he posted a 22–7 record with a 1.74 ERA in 35 games. He played for the Yankees from 1919 to 1923, appearing in two World Series with the club in 1921 and 1922. Mays best season in New York was in 1921, as he led the American League with 27 wins and 336.2 innings pitched.

Manager Pat Moran became ill during the off-season, and was unable to resume being the Reds manager. Moran's medical condition worsened throughout the off-season, and he was unable to join the team in spring training. Moran eventually died from Bright's Disease on March 7, 1924. Replacing Moran as manager was Jack Hendricks, who had previously been the manager of the St. Louis Cardinals during the 1918 season, leading them to a record of 51–78 during his only season managing the club.

Regular season 
The Reds began the season with a very solid 15–7 record in their first 22 games, leading the National League by 1.5 games over the second place New York Giants. The Reds early success would not last though, as the team struggled to a 3–11 mark over the next couple of weeks, falling to a record of 18–18, and into third place, 3.5 games behind the first place Giants.

On May 30, the Reds traded outfielder George Harper to the Philadelphia Phillies for outfielder Curt Walker. Walker, who was five years younger than Harper at 27 years old, had a solid career with the Phillies, with his best season in 1922, as he batted .337 with 12 home runs and 89 RBI. To start the 1924 season with the Phillies, Walker batted .296 with a home run and 8 RBI in 24 games.

The club continued to struggle, and hit to a season low five games under .500 on June 26, following a 2–1 loss to the St. Louis Cardinals, dropping their record to 29–34 and in fifth place, 12.5 games behind the Giants. The team did rebound, and eventually climbed back over the .500 level, however, they continued to sit in fifth place. In the second game of a double header on July 8, Reds pitcher Eppa Rixey pitched a 16 inning complete game in a 2–1 win over the Philadelphia Phillies.

In September, the Reds would move into fourth place, and would finish the season with a record of 83–70, 10.5 games behind the pennant winning New York Giants. This marked the seventh time in the past eight seasons that the Reds finished with a winning record.

Outfielder Edd Roush led the way offensively, as he led the club with a .348 batting average, and led the National League with 21 triples. Roush finished in 10th place in National League MVP voting. Rookie second baseman Hughie Critz had a very solid season, batting .322 with three home runs and 35 RBI in 102 games. Outfielder Curt Walker batted .300 with four home runs and 46 RBI following his mid-season trade from the Philadelphia Phillies. Rube Bressler, who split time between the outfield and first base, batted .347 with four home runs and 45 RBI in 115 games.

Carl Mays emerged as the ace of the Reds pitching staff in 1924, as in his first season with the club, he earned a record of 20–9 with a 3.15 ERA in 226 innings pitched. Eppa Rixey posted a 16–15 record with a 2.76 ERA in 238.1 innings pitched, while Pete Donohue had another solid season, going 16–9 with a 3.60 ERA in 222.1 innings pitched. Dolf Luque struggled to a 10–15 record with a 3.16 ERA, however, he did lead the staff with 86 strikeouts.

Season standings

Record vs. opponents

Game log

Roster

Player stats

Batting

Starters by position
Note: Pos = Position; G = Games played; AB = At bats; H = Hits; Avg. = Batting average; HR = Home runs; RBI = Runs batted in

Other batters
Note: G = Games played; AB = At bats; H = Hits; Avg. = Batting average; HR = Home runs; RBI = Runs batted in

Pitching

Starting pitchers
Note: G = Games pitched; IP = Innings pitched; W = Wins; L = Losses; ERA = Earned run average; SO = Strikeouts

Other pitchers
Note: G = Games pitched; IP = Innings pitched; W = Wins; L = Losses; ERA = Earned run average; SO = Strikeouts

Relief pitchers
Note: G = Games pitched; W = Wins; L = Losses; SV = Saves; ERA = Earned run average; SO = Strikeouts

References 
1924 Cincinnati Reds season at Baseball Reference

Cincinnati Reds seasons
Cincinnati Reds season
Cincinnati Reds